G. dubia may refer to:
 Gymnoclytia dubia, a tachinid fly species found in North America
 Gymnosoma dubia, a tachinid fly species

See also
 Dubia (disambiguation)